Quintus Marcius Philippus was a name used by men of the gens Marcia in Ancient Rome. They belonged to the Marcii Philippi.

 Quintus Marcius, grandfather of the consul in 281 BC.
 Quintus Marcius Q.f., father of the consul in 281 BC. Possibly the same person as Quintus Marcius Tremulus.
 Quintus Marcius Philippus, consul in 281 BC, triumphed over the Etruscans, nominated magister equitum in 263 by the dictator Gnaeus Fulvius Maximus Centumalus.
 Quintus Marcius Philippus, praetor in 188 BC of Sicily, consul in 186 and 169, later censor in 164. 
 Quintus Marcius Q. f. L. n. Philippus, son of the consul in 186 and 169 BC, served under his father in Macedonia.
 Quintus Marcius Philippus, according to Cicero, was condemned, and went into exile at Nuceria, where he became a citizen. He might possibly be the same as the son of the consul of 186 and 169 BC.
 Quintus Marcius Philippus, proconsul of Cilicia from 47 to 46 BC. 

Quintus
Ancient Roman prosopographical lists